Air Conflicts: Secret Wars is an arcade combat flight simulator video game set in World War I and II. It was developed by Slovak studio Games Farm and published by bitComposer Games. It was released on 30 September 2011. It is a sequel to the original 2006 Air Conflicts. It was ported to the Nintendo Switch in March 2019 as part of a collection with Air Conflicts: Pacific Carriers.

Plot
The player controls a female pilot named Dorothy Derbec, nicknamed DeeDee, who is trying to solve the death of her father, Guillaume Derbec. Alongside with her friends Tommy Carter and Clive, the players progress through the game. From Tobruk to Russia to the Balkans and finally to Berlin, Tommy and Clive both die while progressing. In the Berlin campaign, she finds out that one friend killed her father in WW1 because her father couldn't stand watching bombers drop chemical gas on a village. While progressing, the player unlocks airplanes, ranging from classics such as the Spitfire to experimental planes like the Horten Ho 229.

Reception 

The Xbox 360, Playstation 3, and Windows versions of the game both received "mixed or average reviews" according to the review aggregator Metacritic.

References

2011 video games
Flight simulation video games
World War I video games
World War II video games
Windows games
PlayStation 3 games
PlayStation 4 games
Xbox 360 games
Video games developed in Slovakia
War video games set in the British Empire
Video games set in Serbia
Video games set in Belgrade
Nintendo Switch games
BitComposer Interactive games
Single-player video games